June James (born October 11, 1990), also known as  June, The Genius, is an American record producer from Houston, Texas. In 2016, he signed a record deal with Think It's A Game Entertainment and produced YFN Lucci's second mixtape Wish Me Well 2, which included the hit single "Key to the Streets". That was followed by producing Lucci's first single off his EP Long Live Nut,  "Everyday We Lit" featuring PnB Rock which has peaked at number 33 on the Billboard Hot 100 and became his highest charting produced single thus far.

Early life 
June James was born on October 11, 1990, in Houston, Texas where he grew up. James studied at Texas Southern University where he was a member of the Ocean of Soul alongside The Chopstars DJ Hollygrove. While a member he met other artists and DJs which led him to curate LAD DJ's – a coalition started in 2011 that grew to about 40 members. He also founded the music group, The Hit Cartel in 2014 which includes producers, engineers, songwriters, disc jockeys, and artists.

Since then, June has produced for multiple artists, including T.I., Gucci Mane, and Young Dolph. He was awarded “Producer of the Year” at Houston's Hottest Awards in 2014 and was awarded his second “Producer of the Year” award at the 2015 Go DJ Awards. In February 2016, he produced tracks on Lucci's Wish Me Well 2 mixtape, which peaked at number 183 on the US Billboard 200 chart. The mixtape's hit single "Key to the Streets" featuring Migos and Trouble, peaked at number 70 on the US Billboard Hot 100 chart. The official remix version of the song featured 2 Chainz, Lil Wayne and Quavo. "Key to the Streets" was included on XXL magazine's 50 Best Hip-Hop Songs of 2016 list and Vibe magazine's The 60 Best Songs Of 2016 list.

Career

In December 2016, June signed an exclusive songwriter and co-publishing agreement with Think It's A Game Entertainment and continued his success with the company after James’ “Key To The Streets” went to No. 1 on Urban Radio on November 14. James also produced the song's remix featuring guest artists 2 Chainz, Lil Wayne and Quavo, as well as the Genius Mix from “The Key To The Streets Keychain Remix Pack”.

He worked with YFN Lucci on his debut hit "Everyday We Lit" featuring PnB Rock.

James also produced the track "Yosemite" on Travis Scott's album Astroworld that debuted at number one on Billboard 200 Chart With Second-Largest Debut of 2018. The track features vocals from Gunna and Nav.

James also worked on the track "Underdog" with American rappers Lil Baby and Gunna on their mixtape "Drip Harder".

In 2019, James worked with rapper Drake on his track titled "When To Say When" featuring samples of JAY Z "Song Cry" that appeared on the OVO leader's YouTube channel as an official video.

Production 

EPs
 Long Live Nut (2017)
 Freda's Son (2018)

Mixtapes
 Wish Me Well (2014)
 Wish Me Well 2 (2016)

Singles
 Key To The Streets YFN Lucci (2016)
 Everyday We Lit YFN Lucci & PnB Rock (2017)
 Chosen One YoungBoy Never Broke Again (2017)
 Shawty Wassup Yung Nation (2017)
 Never Worried YFN Lucci (2017)
 Aqquital MoneyBagg Yo & YoungBoy Never Broke Again (2017)
 OK Bitch 2 Chainz (2018)
 Nicki Minaj YoungBoy Never Broke Again (2018)
 Chosen One YoungBoy Never Broke Again & Kodak Black  (2018)
 Yosemite Travis Scott (2018)
 Everyday We Sick Lil Wayne (2018)
 Put a Date on It Yo Gotti & Lil Baby(2019)
 Out Tha Mud Roddy Ricch (2019)
 Virgil Discount 2 Chainz T.R.U. & Skooly (2020)
 When To Say When Drake (2020)

References

External links
 June James at Discogs

1990 births
Living people
Musicians from Houston
Record producers from Texas
African-American record producers
21st-century African-American people